Pendulum are an Australian drum and bass band originating from Perth, Western Australia. They have released three studio albums, one live album, one compilation, twenty-four singles and twelve music videos.

Pendulum were formed in 2002 by Rob Swire, Gareth McGrillen and Paul "El Hornet" Harding in Perth. Their first individual single release was the double A-side "Spiral" / "Ulterior Motive" in July 2003. The single was only released in New Zealand and did not receive much publicity, but later that year their track "Vault" was met with widespread underground recognition. Soon after, the band relocated to the United Kingdom where they were joined by guitarist Peredur ap Gwynedd, drummer Paul Kodish, and MC Ben "the Verse" Mount.

Their first full-length release followed in July 2005 with the album Hold Your Colour. Five singles were produced from the album, including "Slam" / "Out Here", the first single by Pendulum to reach the top forty in the UK Singles Chart. In addition, two non-album singles were released. The first was Pendulum's remix of "Voodoo People" originally by The Prodigy, released on 3 October 2005. It reached number twenty in the UK charts and was the band's most successful single for almost three years. This was followed by "Blood Sugar" / "Axle Grinder", released on 18 June 2007, which was later appended to the reissue of Hold Your Colour due to its popularity.

Pendulum's second album, In Silico, was released in May 2008 to significant commercial success. The album charted at number two in the United Kingdom and at number nine in Australia, and has been certified Platinum in the UK. Four singles have been released from In Silico. The most successful of these is "Propane Nightmares", which reached number nine in the UK Singles Chart and was nominated for Best Single at the Kerrang! Awards 2008 ceremony.

The band's third album titled Immersion was released on 24 May 2010. It peaked at number one in the United Kingdom during its first week of release, marking the band's success. The lead single from the album "Watercolour" reached number four on the UK Singles Chart, making it Pendulum's highest-charting single to date. So far, Immersion has been their most successful album based on sales and chart success.

Albums

Studio albums

Live albums

Compilation albums

Remix albums

Extended plays

Singles

As lead artist

As featured artist

Promotional singles

I  Released first on Skool of Hard Knocks.
II  Released first on Paranoia EP – Part 1.

Remixes

III  Released only on Australian iTunes Store.

Music videos

Other appearances
The following songs have been made, remixed or covered by Pendulum, and have not appeared on any studio album or single released by Pendulum.

Notable compilation appearances

Guest appearances

Studio appearances as remixer

Notes

References

General
 Pendulum. rolldabeats. Retrieved on 22 September 2008.
 The full Pendulum discography. Pendulum. Archived on 28 September 2008.
Specific

External links
 Official website
 [ Pendulum] at Allmusic
 Pendulum at Discogs

Discography
Discographies of Australian artists
Rock music group discographies
Electronic music discographies